The Up Your Alley Fair, most commonly referred to by locals as Dore Alley Fair or simply Dore Alley , is a leather and fetish event held in San Francisco, California, on the last Sunday of July on Folsom Street between 9th and 10th Streets and on Dore Street from Howard Street to half a block southeast of Folsom Street. The streets are lined with vendors' booths, and a sound stage (for dancing) is located at the 10th Street end of the fair area.

The first Up Your Alley Street Fair was held in 1985 on Ringold Street between 8th and 9th Streets. The event was moved to its current location on Folsom Street at Dore Street in 1987. Among the original rationales for this fair was to illustrate, in the face of redevelopment pressures, that the South of Market neighborhood was already home to a leather subculture and that this community was still active and organized in spite of the AIDS pandemic.

Now run by the same non-profit organization that produces the much larger Folsom Street Fair, the world's largest BDSM fetish and leather event, Up Your Alley Fair draws ten thousand fetish enthusiasts and onlookers and serves as a "warm-up" event for the organizers but also as a less tourist-focused event for locals. Steamworks Baths hosts a Twister stage, and there is dancing, DJs, STI testing, and fetish wear sales. This fair is more gay-male focused than the Folsom Street Fair, but welcoming to all sexes and sexual orientations.

In 2020, both the Up Your Alley Fair and Folsom were cancelled as a result of the Covid-19 pandemic.

See also 
Folsom Street Fair
Social nudity in San Francisco

References

External links

Official site

BDSM organizations
Culture of San Francisco
LGBT events in California
LGBT culture in San Francisco
Leather events
Street fairs
Clothing-optional events
Cultural festivals in the United States
South of Market, San Francisco